Quch Hesar (also Romanized as Qūch Ḩeşār, Qūch Ḩeşar, and Qūchḩeşār) is a village in Kahrizak Rural District of Kahrizak District of Ray County, Tehran province, Iran. At the 2006 National Census, its population was 4,399 in 1,046 households. The following census in 2011 counted 4,330 people in 1,154 households. The latest census in 2016 showed a population of 6,888 people in 1,937 households; it was the largest village in its rural district.

References 

Ray County, Iran

Populated places in Tehran Province

Populated places in Ray County, Iran